Marmorofusus verrucosus is a species of sea snail, a marine gastropod mollusc in the family Fasciolariidae, the spindle snails, the tulip snails and their allies.

Subspecies Fusinus verrucosus var. chuni Martens, 1904 is a synonym of Fusinus chuni (Martens, 1904)

Description
The length of the shell varies between 50 mm and 90 mm.

Distribution
This marine species occurs in the Mediterranean Sea, the Suez Canal, the Western Indian Ocean and in the Persian Gulf.

References

 ermes. In: Gmelin J.F. (Ed.) Caroli a Linnaei Systema Naturae per Regna Tria Naturae, Editio Decima Tertia, Aucta Reformata. Tome 1, Pars 6 (Vermes). G.E. Beer, Lipsiae [Leipzig]. pp. 3021–3910

External links

 
 Gmelin J.F. (1791). Vermes. In: Gmelin J.F. (Ed.) Caroli a Linnaei Systema Naturae per Regna Tria Naturae, Ed. 13. Tome 1(6). G.E. Beer, Lipsiae [Leipzig]. pp. 3021-3910
 Philippi, R. A. (1842-1850). Abbildungen und Beschreibungen neuer oder wenig gekannter Conchylien unter Mithülfe meherer deutscher Conchyliologen. Cassel, T. Fischer: Vol. 1: 1-20 [1842], 21-76 [1843], 77-186 [1844], 187-204 [1845]; Vol. 2: 1-64 [1845], 65-152 [1846], 153-232 [1847] ; Vol. 3: 1-50 [1847], 51-82 [1848], 1-88 [1849], 89-138
  Sowerby, G. B., II. (1842-1887). Thesaurus Conchyliorum: Or monographs of genera of shells. London, privately published: vol. 1: p. 1-438, pl. 1-91 [cover date 1847; vol. 2: p. 439 899, pl. 92-186 [cover date 1855]; vol. 3: p. 1-331, pl. 187-290 [cover date: 1866]; vol. 4 p. 1-110, pl. 292-423 [cover date 1880]; vol. 5: p. 1-305, pl. 424-517 [cover date 1887] - Details of dates in Petit R.E. 2009 Zootaxa 2189: 35-37; dates of different parts behind cover page of volume I in the copy of BHL. , available online at http://www.biodiversitylibrary.org/item/54562
page(s): 75, 96, pl. 3 [= 407 bis] fig. 19, pl. 14 [= 417 bis] fig. 164]
 Lyons W.G. & Snyder M.A. (2019). Reassignments to the genus Marmorofusus Snyder & Lyons, 2014 (Neogastropoda: Fasciolariidae: Fusininae) of species from the Red Sea, Indian Ocean, and southwestern Australia. Zootaxa. 4714(1): 1-64.

verrucosus
Gastropods described in 1791